Uranophora leucotelus is a moth in the subfamily Arctiinae. It was described by Arthur Gardiner Butler in 1876. It is found in southern Texas, Mexico, Belize, Guatemala, Honduras, Costa Rica and Venezuela.

The wingspan is about 26 mm. The forewings are black with metallic blue at the base and with prominent hyaline streaks and a white patch at the apex. The hindwings have greyish shading along the costa. Adults have been recorded feeding on flower nectar.

References

Moths described in 1876
Euchromiina